The All-China Federation of Returned Overseas Chinese (abbreviated ACFROC or ) is a united front organization of the Chinese Communist Party (CCP) to influence overseas Chinese. ACFROC has 27 seats on the national committee of the Chinese People's Political Consultative Conference.

History
In July 1937, the "Office for Overseas Chinese in Yan'an" was established, who on 5 September 1940 organized the first "Yan'an Overseas Chinese Congress". At the congress, the "Yan'an Overseas Chinese National Salvation Association" was created, which on 12 March 1946 changed its name to "Yan'an Overseas Chinese Association", and again in 1948 to "China Federation of Returned Overseas Chinese from Liberated Areas".

On 8 July 1950, the "Preparatory Committee of the Returned Overseas Chinese Association of the People's Republic of China" was formed in Beijing.

In June 1956, following a decree from the Overseas Chinese Affairs Office, the "Preparatory Committee of the All-China Federation of Returned Overseas Chinese" was created, and later on 12 October, the "All-China Federation of Returned Overseas Chinese" was formed in Beijing.

References

External links 

 

Organizations based in Beijing
Organizations established in 1956
Organizations associated with the Chinese Communist Party
Overseas Chinese organisations
United front (China)